Seshat (under various spellings) was the ancient Egyptian goddess of writing, wisdom, and knowledge. She was seen as a scribe and record keeper; her name means "female scribe". She is credited with inventing writing. She also became identified as the goddess of accounting, architecture, astronomy, astrology, building, mathematics, and surveying.

Origins
Seshat is attested from the Second Dynasty, where she assists King Khasekhemwy with the "stretching the cord" ritual.

Roles
As the divine measurer and scribe, Seshat was believed to appear to assist the pharaoh in both of these practises. Seshat assisted the pharaoh in the "stretching the cord" ritual. This ritual is related to laying out the foundations of temples and other important structures in order to determine and assure the sacred alignments and the precision of the dimensions. She was also the "mistress of builders", and laid the plans for the construction and expansion of sacred sites such as temples. Her skills were necessary for surveying the land, to re-establish boundary-lines after the annual floods. The priestess who officiated at these functions in her name also oversaw the staff of others who performed similar duties and were trained in mathematics and the related store of knowledge.

She also was responsible for recording the speeches the pharaoh made during the crowning-ceremony and approving the inventory of foreign captives and goods gained in military campaigns. During the New Kingdom, she was involved in the Sed festival held by the pharaohs, who could celebrate thirty years of reign, recording the regnal years of the king and his jubilees on leaves of the ished or persea tree. It was she who recorded, by notching her palm, the time allotted to the pharaoh for his stay on earth.

"Mistress of the House of Books" is another title for Seshat, being the deity whose priests oversaw the library in which scrolls of the most important knowledge were assembled and spells were preserved. One prince of the Fourth Dynasty, Wep-em-nefret, is noted as the Overseer of the Royal Scribes, Priest of Seshat on a slab stela. Heliopolis was the location of her principal sanctuary.

Seshat also appeared in funerary contexts, where, along with Nephthys, she restores the limbs of the deceased.

Seshat was closely associated with Thoth (Djehuty in ancient Egyptian), the reckoner of time and god of writing who was also venerated as a god of wisdom, with whom he shared some overlapping functions. She was variously considered to be the sister, wife, or daughter of Thoth. Seshat is the inventor of writing and Thoth taught writing to man.

Iconography
In ancient Egyptian art, she was depicted as a woman with a seven-pointed emblem above her head. It is unclear what this emblem represents. This emblem is the origin of an alternate name for Seshat, Sefkhet-Abwy, which means "seven-horned". Usually, she is shown holding a palm stem, bearing notches to denote the recording of the passage of time, especially for keeping track of the allotment of time for the life of the pharaoh. She was also depicted holding other tools and, often, holding the knotted cords that were stretched to survey land and structures. She is frequently shown dressed in a cheetah- or leopard-hide, a symbol of funerary priests. If not shown with the hide over a dress, the pattern of the dress is that of the spotted feline. The pattern on the natural hide was thought to represent the stars, being a symbol of eternity, and to be associated with the night sky.

Emblem

The Seshat emblem is a hieroglyph representing the goddess Seshat in ancient Egypt. As the emblem symbolizes this deity, it sits atop her head. The emblem was a long stem with a seven-petal flower on top and surmounted by a pair of horns; the archaic form had seven petals (the vertical shaft as 8), (as a vertical, with two crossed lines-(4), as a 'star', and one horizontal, giving 7+ the 1-vertical shaft), and surmounted by two enclosing sickle-shaped signs, two falcon-feathers on top.

Alan Gardiner identified the emblem as a "conventionalized flower (?) surmounted by horns." Alternatively, the symbol may represent a device similar to a groma.

The famous 24th century BC Palermo Stone has multiple uses of Seshat's emblem. It occurs on the obverse of the Palermo Piece (at Palermo Museum), 1 of the 2 large pieces of the 7—piece Palermo Stone. It is used on the obverse, Row III (of VI rows), and is used twice in King Year Record 34, and 40 of King Den. It is also used elsewhere on the stone for God Seshu, the male counterpart of Seshat (Seshait or Sesha-t).

F31:X1.R21 ! U1-S39-Z9:Z9 ! I9:D47:X1-S39-Z9:Z9 !!

The reading is approximately: "YEAR: To create (a) Statue for Seshait, Statue for Mafdet." (The King Year 34 register has the clearer of the two styles of Seshat Emblem, with larger spacing between the two vertical feathers. Note: the Gardiner font reads left-to-right; the Palermo Stone is written opposite: right-to-left. A large renpet (hieroglyph) for YEAR, precedes the register (forms its starting border).)

Worship
Seshat barely appears outside of her official role as the recorder of construction and written projects and did not have a temple or cult dedicated to her.

Gallery

See also
 Gardiner's Sign List#R. Temple Furniture and Sacred Emblems

References

Further reading
 Budge, 1920, (1978).  An Egyptian Hieroglyphic Dictionary, E.A.Wallace Budge, (Dover Publications), c 1978, (c 1920), Dover edition, 1978. (In two volumes, 1314 pp. and cliv-(154) pp.) (softcover)

Egyptian goddesses
Wisdom goddesses
Knowledge goddesses
Scribes
Writing